Attorney misconduct is unethical or illegal conduct by an attorney. Attorney misconduct may include: conflict of interest, overbilling, refusing to represent a client for political or professional motives, false or misleading statements, knowingly accepting worthless lawsuits, hiding evidence, abandoning a client, failing to disclose all relevant facts, arguing a position while neglecting to disclose prior law which might counter the argument, or having sex with a client.

The advent of electronic record-keeping and "e-discovery" has also resulted in a record number of attorney sanctions for a range of abuses from failure to produce to the leaking of sealed documents.  In a case highlighting such abuses, in 2007 plaintiffs in a pharmaceutical lawsuit were found to conspire with attorneys and journalists to publicize protected discovery documents defying a judge's protective order.

Legal malpractice is a separate concept such as when an attorney fails to adequately, professionally, competently, or zealously represent a client. While malpractice and misconduct may often be found in the same matter, they are separate concepts and need not both exist.

Codification of rules and enforcement

The American Bar Association (ABA) has established model rules of professional conduct expected of attorneys, which most states in the U.S. have incorporated as part of their state laws. Each state issues its own set of rules governing the ethical rules and the related enforcement of those rules, generally through their state bar associations. As the state bar organizations and their enforcement mechanisms are composed of lawyers who set the rules, the regulation of attorney ethics is self regulated and self policed. Some academic researchers and industry pundits have asserted that attorney discipline in the U.S. is ineffective, and favors lawyers and law firms.

Individual lawyers or their firms may be cited for misconduct by a judge in the originating proceedings or by a corresponding state bar.

No solicitation rule 
In many circumstances it is considered unethical for attorneys to seek out clients for lawsuits. Direct mail contact after an airline crash is permitted after the 45 days have passed. Since Bates v. State Bar of Arizona, lawyers have been permitted to advertise for clients as long as the ads are not false or misleading. Prior to the decision in 1977, acceptable advertising was limited to professional journals.

In Ohralik v. Ohio State Bar Assn., the U.S. Supreme Court upheld rules against lawyers directly making unsolicited contact with potential clients. There is an exception to this rule if the clients already have an earlier professional or personal relationship with the attorney. Another exception to the rule is that lawyers are allowed to solicit clients for litigation related to political causes instead of seeking money.

Notes and references

External Links & Articles
American Bar Association
American Bar Association Model Rules of Professional Conduct

Legal ethics
Misconduct
Professional ethics